Maxime Méderel (born 19 September 1980 in Limoges) is a French former road bicycle racer, who competed professionally between 2008 and 2015 for the , ,  and  squads. As well as this, he competed for the amateur teams Panorimo 23 La Creuse En Limousin, UC Châteauroux-Fenioux and UV Limousine. He is presently the team manager of the Pôle Espoirs de Guéret.

Méderel joined  for the 2014 season, after his previous team –  – folded at the end of the 2013 season.

Major results

2005
 1st Overall Tour de la Manche
 1st Paris–Mantes-en-Yvelines
 6th Trophée des Grimpeurs
2006
 1st Polymultipliée Lyonnaise
 1st Stage 7 Tour de Normandie
 4th Grand Prix de Plumelec-Morbihan
 5th Trophée des Grimpeurs
 8th Overall Étoile de Bessèges
 8th Tour du Doubs
2007
 1st Limoges Cyclo-cross
 2nd Paris–Mantes-en-Yvelines
 2nd Trophée des Grimpeurs
2008
 4th Overall Paris–Corrèze
2009
 2nd Overall Circuit de Lorraine
 7th Overall Paris–Corrèze
 8th Boucles de l'Aulne
 10th Route Adélie
2010
 2nd Paris–Camembert
 5th Paris–Mantes-en-Yvelines
 6th Grand Prix de Plumelec-Morbihan
2011
 1st Stage 5 Tour de Bretagne
 4th Overall Tour Alsace
 4th Overall Tour de l'Ain
 4th Paris–Camembert
 7th Tour du Finistère
 8th Overall Route du Sud
2012
 8th Overall Tour du Gévaudan Languedoc-Roussillon
 9th Klasika Primavera
2013
 3rd Overall Tour of Turkey
 10th Overall Rhône-Alpes Isère Tour

References

External links 

French male cyclists
1980 births
Living people
Sportspeople from Limoges
Cyclists from Nouvelle-Aquitaine